The venous plexus of hypoglossal canal (TA) – also known as plexus venosus canalis nervi hypoglossi (TA), circellus venosus hypoglossi and rete canalis hypoglossi – is a small venous plexus around the hypoglossal nerve that connects with the occipital sinus, the inferior petrosal sinus and the internal jugular vein. Occasionally, it may be a single vein rather than a venous plexus.

Notes

References
 

 

Veins of the head and neck